J. W. Swanston  was a Newcastle printer, and publisher of many Chapbooks. The premises were in St Andrews Street, off Gallowgate, and is now quite near St James' Park, the home of Newcastle United F.C., although this ground was not built until 1892, at the time of Swanston it was just a patch of sloping grazing land, near the Town Moor, and owned by the Freemen of the City.

Swanston was responsible for the publication and printing of numerous Chapbooks, of which one noted version was The Tyneside Songster.

He was also a member of the Tyneside Naturalists' Field Club"

His published and printed works include :-
 Nine Hours’ Movement; A History of the engineers’ strike in Newcastle and Gateshead
 Social Science and the Liquor Traffic: The Judgment of Science, of Philanthropy, and of Intellect, an 8-page pamphlet printed in 1870
 Several pamphlets for the Northern Reform League for James McKendrick
 Several Chapbooks including The Tyneside Songster

See also 
Geordie dialect words
The Tyneside Songster by J W Swanston

References

External links
 FARNE - Folk Archive Resource North East – front cover
 FARNE archive – click “Tyneside songster” and “go”

People from Newcastle upon Tyne (district)
Northumbrian folklore
Music publishing companies of the United Kingdom
English folk songs
Music in Newcastle upon Tyne
Geordie songwriters
19th-century births
Year of death unknown